The Communauté d'agglomération Paris - Vallée de la Marne is a communauté d'agglomération in the Seine-et-Marne département and in the Île-de-France région of France. It was formed on 1 January 2016 by the merger of the former Communauté d'agglomération de Marne et Chantereine, Communauté d'agglomération de Marne-la-Vallée - Val Maubuée and Communauté d'agglomération de la Brie Francilienne. Its seat is in Torcy. Its area is 95.8 km2. Its population was 227,943 in 2018, of which 55,148 in Chelles.

Composition
It consists of 12 communes:

Brou-sur-Chantereine
Champs-sur-Marne
Chelles
Courtry
Croissy-Beaubourg
Émerainville
Lognes
Noisiel
Pontault-Combault
Roissy-en-Brie
Torcy
Vaires-sur-Marne

References 

Paris - Vallée de la Marne
Paris - Vallée de la Marne